Orthodes jamaicensis is a moth of the family Noctuidae. It is found in Central America and South America and on the  Antilles.

References

Moths described in 1858
Leucania